Robert Roderick Meyers (August 11, 1924 – March 22, 2014) was a Canadian ice hockey player. He was a member of the Edmonton Mercurys that won a gold medal at the 1952 Winter Olympics in Oslo, Norway.

External links

Robert Meyers' profile at Sports Reference.com
Robert Meyers' obituary

1924 births
2014 deaths
Ice hockey players at the 1952 Winter Olympics
Olympic gold medalists for Canada
Olympic ice hockey players of Canada
Olympic medalists in ice hockey
Medalists at the 1952 Winter Olympics
Ice hockey people from Edmonton
Canadian ice hockey defencemen